The Muriel Sutherland Snowden International School at Copley (formerly Copley High School) is a public high school located in Boston, Massachusetts, United States. Its international-themed curriculum was introduced by the school's namesake, Muriel S. Snowden, in 1983. The school was renamed after Snowden in 1988.

As a part of the international-themed curriculum, students are required to take four years of a foreign language: (Spanish, French, Chinese, or Japanese). In addition to the language component, Snowden International School has the goal of having twenty five percent of each student class take part in exchange/immersion programs to foreign countries including China, Japan, Canada, England and Costa Rica.

Special features
Snowden offers students an accelerated college preparatory curriculum, the Advanced Placement program, and beginning in 2010, the International Baccalaureate Diploma Programme.

The school also has a college-like campus setting in Boston's historic Copley Square, the Princeton University Mentoring program, and formal connections to both the Freedom House, Inc. and Upward Bound at Boston University.

Athletics
The school mascot for Snowden International School is the cougar. The school colors are green and gold. Snowden competes in boys and girls basketball, girls volleyball, track and field, ice hockey, field hockey, baseball, and softball. Students can participate in football through a cooperative program hosted by South Boston High School.

Notable alumni
1973 Karen Miller, First African American female firefighter of the City of Boston 
1987 Danny Wood, Entertainer, New Kids on the Block 
1989 Donnie Wahlberg, Entertainer, New Kids on the Block
1989 Mark Wahlberg, Entertainer, Marky Mark and The Funky Bunch

References

External links

 WGBH School Profile
Boston Public Schools Profile

High schools in Boston
Public high schools in Massachusetts
International schools in the United States
International Baccalaureate schools in Massachusetts